Vasily Petrov may refer to:

 Vasily Vladimirovich Petrov (1761–1834), Russian physicist who discovered an electric arc effect
 Vasily Ivanovich Petrov (1917–2014), Soviet marshal
 Vasily Stepanovich Petrov (1922–2003), twice Hero of the Soviet Union
 Vasily Rodionovich Petrov (1875–1937), Russian opera singer

See also 
 Petrov (disambiguation)